Majitar is the fastest growing urban village in Pakyong District in the Indian state of Sikkim. The nearest towns are Rangpo ( away) and Singtam. Majitar lies on the National Highway 10 connecting Siliguri and  Gangtok. Sikkim Manipal Institute of Technology campus lies in Majitar and Rangpo railway station lies in Khanikhola, Majitar.

Demographics
Majitar has a large population of Sikkimese Nepalese, Sikkimese Bhutia, Marwari and Bengali people. Although there are students from all over the country, mainly those from Bihar, Uttar Pradesh, Jharkhand and Guwahati live at Sikkim Manipal Institute of Technology. Sikkimese Nepali is the predominant language but because of the presence of student from all over the country, people speak Hindi too.

Geography
It lies on the bank of River Teesta.

Transport
As Majitar lies on National Highway 10, frequent taxis are available towards many towns and cities of Sikkim and West Bengal. 
SNT buses connecting Gangtok to Sikkim Nationalised Transport Bus Terminus (Siliguri), and private and NBSTC buses connecting Gangtok to Tenzing Norgay Bus Terminus (Siliguri) are frequently available from Majitar.

New Sikkim Railway Project
Sikkim Railway Link
A rail link from Sevoke is under construction.
Rail Budget 2010 also in Rail budget 2010-11 further extension to Gangtok has been announced.

See also
 East Sikkim district
 Singtam
 Rangpo

References

Villages in Pakyong district
Cities and towns in Pakyong district
 Pakyong district